The telescope shiner (Notropis telescopus) is a species of ray-finned fish in the genus Notropis. 
Notropis telescopus is primarily found in a small range of waters located in the Southeastern Region of the United States. There is very little published record of the research and management involving the telescope shiner. The following research will provide information on this species that can be helpful toward monitoring efforts of Notropis telescopus populations.
The primary population of telescope shiners occurs throughout drainages of the Tennessee and Cumberland Rivers. This population is distributed throughout Virginia, Kentucky, Tennessee, and Alabama. A second known population occurs in Arkansas and Missouri and is found in the White and Black river systems.

The telescope shiner gets its name due to the relatively large eye it possesses compared to other Notropis species. Adult telescopus usually have a length range from 50 to 105 mm. Unlike some other shiners and darters, the telescope shiner is not known for any outstanding coloration.

Notropis telescopus occurs in cooler waters such as quick moving streams and small rivers. They can be found in riffle, run, and pool habitats. According to studies the telescope shiner can do better than other similar species when in waters with higher levels of pH, alkalinity, magnesium, and dissolved oxygen. When it comes to feeding, the telescope shiner is classified as an insectivore. 
Telescope shiners are classified in the spawning guild lithophil. They prefer open rock and gravel to spawn in. Embryos hatch early and stay hidden under the rocks. Notropis species are multiple batch spawners with strong seasonality to gonadal size and condition. The peak of their spawning is usually between April and July.
Current monitoring and management is done by government agencies. Most of these surveys are not specific to the telescope shiner, but rather to determine overall biotic integrity of the streams and river systems.

References 

Gilbert, Carter R. "Systematics and Distribution of the American Cyprinid Fishes Notropis ariommus and Notropis telescopus". Copeia: August 29, 1969, Vol. 1969, No. 3, pp. 474–492. American Society of Ichthyologists and Herpetologists
Stauffer Jr., Jay R., Jeffrey M. Boltz, Laura R. White . "The Fishes of West Virginia ." Proceedings of the Academy of Natural Sciences of Philadelphia: 1995, Vol. 146, pp. 1–389.
Lobb III, M. Delbert, Donald J. Orth. "Habitat Use by an Assemblage of Fish in a Large Warmwater Stream". Transactions of the American Fisheries Society: 1991, Vol. 120, pp. 65–78
Mettee, Maurice F., Patrick E. O'Neil, and J. Malcolm Pierson. Fishes of Alabama and the Mobile Basin. Birmingham, AL: Oxmoor House, 1996.
Bruenderman, SA, RJ Neves. "Life history of the endangered fine-rayed pigtoe Fusconaia cuneolus (Bivalvia: Unionidae) in the Clinch River, Virginia". American Malacological Bulletin: 1993, Vol. 10, No. 1, pp. 83–91.
Holmes, Brittany, Lindsay Whittington, Loren Marino, Andrew Adrian, and Bruce Stallsmith. "Reproductive Timing of the Telescope Shiner, Notropis telescopus, in Alabama, USA". The American Midland Naturalist: 2010, Vol. 163, No. 2, pp. 326–334.
Kirsch, Philip H. "Notes on a Collection of Fishes From the Southern Tributaries of the Cumberland River in Kentucky and Tennessee". Bulletin of the U.S. Fish Commission: 1891, pp. 259–268
 Robert Jay Goldstein, Rodney W. Harper, Richard Edwards: American Aquarium Fishes. Texas A&M University Press 2000, p. 102
 

telescopus
Fish described in 1868